Mariette Yvinec is a French researcher in computational geometry at the French Institute for Research in Computer Science and Automation (INRIA) in Sophia Antipolis. She is one of the developers of CGAL, a software library of computational geometry algorithms.

Yvinec is the co-author of two books in computational geometry:
Géometrie Algorithmique (with Jean-Daniel Boissonnat, Edusciences 1995), translated as Algorithmic Geometry (Hervé Brönnimann, trans., Cambridge University Press, 1998)
Geometric and Topological Inference (with Jean-Daniel Boissonnat and Frédéric Chazal, Cambridge Texts in Applied Mathematics, 2018)

References

Year of birth missing (living people)
Living people
French computer scientists
French mathematicians
French women computer scientists
Women mathematicians
Researchers in geometric algorithms